Le Bouscat (Gascon: Lo Boscat) is a commune in the Gironde department in Nouvelle-Aquitaine in southwestern France. It is a suburb of the city of Bordeaux and is adjacent to it on the north side.

Its sister city is Glen Ellyn, Illinois, USA

Population

See also
Communes of the Gironde department

References

External links

 Official website (in French)

Communes of Gironde